The 2003 Women's Hockey Champions Trophy was the 11th edition of the Hockey Champions Trophy for women. It was held from 29 November to 7 December 2003 in Sydney, Australia.

Australia won the tournament for a record sixth time after defeating China 3–2 in the final.

Teams
The participating teams were determined by International Hockey Federation (FIH):
 (Defending champions)
 (Champions of 2002 World Cup)
 (Host nation and champions of 2000 Summer Olympics)
 (Second in 2002 World Cup)
 (Fifth in 2002 World Cup)
 (Sixth in 2002 World Cup)

Squads

Head Coach: Gabriel Minadeo

Head Coach: David Bell

Head Coach: Kim Chang-back

Head Coach: Bobby Crutchley

Head Coach: Lim Heung-sin

Head Coach: Marc Lammers

Umpires
Below are the 9 umpires appointed by the International Hockey Federation:

Julie Ashton-Lucy (AUS)
Lyn Farrell (NZL)
Sarah Garnett (NZL)
Soledad Iparraguirre (ARG)
Jane Nockolds (ENG)
Renate Peters (GER)
Cecilia Valenzuela (CHI)
Minka Woolley (AUS)
Kazuko Yasueda (JPN)

Results
All times are Eastern Daylight Time (UTC+11:00)

Pool

Classification

Fifth and sixth place

Third and fourth place

Final

Awards

Statistics

Final standings

Goalscorers

External links
Official FIH website

2003
TRoph
International women's field hockey competitions hosted by Australia
2003 in women's field hockey
International sports competitions hosted at Sydney Olympic Park
2000s in Sydney
November 2003 sports events in Australia
December 2003 sports events in Australia